Lisa Lavie (surname pronounced lah-) is a Canadian singer and songwriter originally from LaSalle, Quebec, Canada.

Background
Lavie's early musical influences included her older brothers, hip hop dancer Michael and disk jockey Danny. At age 16 Lavie toured Canada as a backup singer with the French-Canadian hip hop group Dubmatique, after which she recorded her own demo CD. Lavie's demo CD reached the same producer who had co-written Mariah Carey's first album, and Lavie accepted his invitation to move to California to work with him.

Career
In 2006, Lavie's vocals were included on the soundtracks of the motion pictures Stick It  and The Guardian.

In 2007, Lavie became one of the earliest to use the Internet to reach fans and arouse interest of record labels. By October her music video "Angel" was featured on YouTube's front page and became a finalist in the 2007 YouTube Awards music category.

Lavie was listed as singer-songwriter in her first album, Everything or Nothing, which was released under an independent record label.

In February 2010, Lavie produced and performed in the charity collaboration video "We Are the World 25 for Haiti (YouTube edition)" for relief of victims of the 2010 Haiti earthquake. Journalist Diane Sawyer named the video's contributors ABC News' "Persons of the Week."

Since 2010 Lavie has been a vocalist of contemporary instrumentalist Yanni on his tours, contributing vocal tracks to Yanni's 2012 live-concert CD/DVD and PBS special, Yanni Live at El Morro, Puerto Rico.

In autumn 2014, Lavie joined the Eastern touring group of Trans-Siberian Orchestra as a vocalist. Lavie was one of seven singers and musicians who were invited to participate in CBC Music's October 2014 Songcamp.

Lavie performed in Yanni's October 2015 The Dream Concert: Live from the Great Pyramids of Egypt and in the resulting 2016 CD/DVD and PBS special.

On March 21, 2017, Lavie released her second album Lisa Lavie which debuted at No. 25 on the R&B Billboard album charts.

Discography

Studio albums

Performances on others' albums or programs

References and notes

External links

 Main (LisaLavie1) channel on YouTube
 Lisa Lavie on Facebook
 Lisa Lavie on Twitter
 Allmusic credits
 Interviews with Marilyn Beck, The Star Scoop, and Salut Magazin

Living people
Canadian singer-songwriters
Canadian soul singers
Canadian contemporary R&B singers
Canadian mezzo-sopranos
Singers from Montreal
People from LaSalle, Quebec
Canadian YouTubers
Canadian women pop singers
Year of birth missing (living people)